The Bryant Vase is a late 19th-century vase currently in the collection of the Metropolitan Museum of Art.

Description  
The vase was created in celebration of American poet William Cullen Bryant's 80th birthday in 1875. A group of Bryant's friends commissioned Tiffany & Co. to craft modern vase in the style of Greek vases. The new vase, done in silver, was then endowed with themes and motifs reflecting some of Bryant's poetry. To this end, the vase's fretwork depicts various plants, including stalks of corn, apple blossom, cattails, and water lilies. Elsewhere on the vase, silver medallions depict scenes from Bryant's life. On the neck of the vase the line "Truth crushed to earth shall rise again" -  from Bryant's 1839 poem The Battlefield - is inscribed in gold.

References 

Metalwork of the Metropolitan Museum of Art
Individual vases